Chrmoium acetylacetonate may refer to:

 Chromium(II) acetylacetonate (chromium diacetylacetonate), Cr(C5H7O2)2
 Chromium(III) acetylacetonate (chromium triacetylacetonate), Cr(C5H7O2)3